Nicholas Leonard Fenton (born 23 November 1979) is an English former professional footballer and head physiotherapist of EFL League One side Burton Albion.

As a player, he was as a defender who played between 1996 and 2014. He played for Manchester City, Notts County, AFC Bournemouth, Doncaster Rovers, Grimsby Town, Rotherham United and Morecambe and Alfreton Town.

Club career

Manchester City
Preston born Fenton came through the youth ranks of Premiership side Manchester City. Though born in England, as he went to a school in Wales he represented Wales at schoolboy level, captaining the under-15 side. He was called up by England at both under-16 and under-18 level. He was promoted to the Manchester City first team squad a few months after the club's relegation in the summer of 1996. By the time Fenton was given his first team debut City had suffered a further relegation into the third tier of English football. On 19 August 1998 Fenton earned his first appearance for City when he started the match in a 7–1 English League Cup victory over Notts County at Maine Road. City earned promotion back to the First Division in May 1999 via the play-offs following a penalty shootout victory over Gillingham at Wembley Stadium, however Fenton although a squad member had not been involved in first team action since February. During the 1999–2000 season Fenton made his final appearance for City in a 4–3 League Cup defeat against Southampton when he came on as a 91st-minute substitute for Richard Edghill. In October 1999 he joined Notts County on loan where he made 13 appearances and scoring his first career goal against Wycombe Wanderers. In March 2000 he signed on loan with AFC Bournemouth where he played 8 times where his performances proved himself worthy of a fresh bid by the club in the 2000–01 season and he returned on loan to Bournemouth in August. Fenton returned to Notts County on loan a month later and on 10 November he joined the club on a permanent deal.

Notts County
Fenton signed for County for £150,000. Fenton played over 150 appearances for The Magpies until his departure at the end of the 2003–04 season.

Doncaster Rovers
His next port of call was to sign with Doncaster Rovers who had previously earned two back to back promotions that had seen the Yorkshire club rise from the Conference National to the Football League One. Fenton played out the 2004–05 and 2005–06 seasons Rovers and after playing in the club's first round League Cup game against Rochdale at the beginning of the 2006–07 season he departed the club.

Grimsby Town
Fenton was signed for Grimsby on 25 August 2006 by Graham Rodger from Doncaster Rovers, the same day that centre half Ben Futcher left the club for Peterborough United. Fenton was joined at Blundell Park by Rovers teammate Ricky Ravenhill. He slotted in at centre half along with Justin Whittle, as the season progressed manager Rodger was replaced by Alan Buckley but he continued to feature as a regular. On the final day of the season he had the distinction of scoring the last ever goal at Shrewsbury Town's Gay Meadow stadium. During the 2007–08 season Fenton was a part of the Grimsby team that made it to the Football League Trophy final at Wembley Stadium, however the club were beaten 2–0 by the Milton Keynes Dons. In the summer of 2008 Fenton was told that he would not be offered a new contract with Grimsby and that he was free to leave the club.

Rotherham United
Fenton was signed by Rotherham United on 8 August 2008 on a free transfer He made his Rotherham United debut away to local rivals Sheffield Wednesday. He had a brilliant game and was given a 9 rating in most match reports. He made his league debut for the Millers away to Morecambe. He scored his first goal for the club when Rotherham caused an upset by beating Championship side Southampton in the League Cup. Fenton kept up his goal scoring form by scoring further goals against Leeds United in the Football League Trophy and Barnet in the league. He was released by the club in May 2011.

Morecambe
He joined League Two side Morecambe in summer 2011 where he enjoyed two mid-table seasons for the Shrimps before leaving early in April 2013 to continue in his physiotherapy training and to find a new club.

Alfreton Town
On 2 August 2013 he signed a contract with Alfreton Town until the end of the 2013-14 season, after impressing in pre-season. Having made 32 league appearances and scored three goals, Fenton was released by Alfreton at the end of the 2013–14 season.

International career
As a youngster Fenton captained Wales under-15s and was called up by England at under-16 and under-18 level.

Physiotherapist
Following his release by Alfreton, Fenton retired from the playing side of the sport and was hired by Burton Albion as the club's team physiotherapist for the 2014-15 season.

Honours

Grimsby Town
Football League Trophy runner up: 2007–08

Manchester City
Second Division Play-off winner: 1998–99
First Division Runner up: 1999-00

References

External links
 Nick Fenton profile at Alfreton Town F.C.
 
 Nick Fenton profile at codalmighty.com

1979 births
Living people
Footballers from Preston, Lancashire
English footballers
England youth international footballers
Welsh footballers
Association football defenders
Manchester City F.C. players
Notts County F.C. players
AFC Bournemouth players
Doncaster Rovers F.C. players
Grimsby Town F.C. players
Rotherham United F.C. players
Morecambe F.C. players
Alfreton Town F.C. players
English Football League players
National League (English football) players
Burton Albion F.C. non-playing staff